Events in the year 2017 in Guinea.

Incumbents
President: Alpha Condé
Prime Minister: Mamady Youla

Events

Deaths
7 January – Cheick Fantamady Camara, film director (b. 1960).

References

 
2010s in Guinea
Years of the 21st century in Guinea
Guinea
Guinea